Canvas is a heavy-duty fabric, used for making sails and as a support for an oil painting.

Canvas may also refer to:

Creative works

Music
 Canvas (album), a 2005 album by Robert Glasper
 Canvas, a 2017 album by Moya Brennan
 Canvas (EP), 2016 EP by South Korean boy group NU'EST
 "Canvas" (song) (2009), by Imogen Heap
 Canvas, a mini-album by Leo
 "Canvas", a song by Holly Miranda from The Magician's Private Library
 Canvas, a 2016 mini-album by NU'EST

Films
 Canvas (2006 film), a film starring Joe Pantoliano and Marcia Gay Harden
 Canvas (2010 film), a Malayalam-language film
 Canvas (2020 film), an American animated short film

Anime
 Canvas 2: Akane-iro no Palette, a 2004 Japanese computer game 
 Canvas 2: Niji Iro no Sketch, a 2005 anime television series adaptation

Geography
 Canvas Creek, a stream in British Columbia, Canada
 Canvas, West Virginia, an unincorporated community in Nicholas County, West Virginia, United States

Technology
Canvas element, part of HTML5
 Canvas X, formerly Canvas, a graphics, drawing, image, and layout editing software application
 Project Canvas (now known as YouView), a UK subscription-free IPTV environment
 Canvas Networks, an image-centric social website created by Christopher Poole
 Canvas, a line of learning management software developed by Instructure
 Canvas (GUI), an interface display component sometimes called a "scene graph"
 GoCanvas, formerly called "Canvas", a company makes mobile apps for data collection and file sharing

Other
 A template and its application as a method in business planning, e.g. the Business Model Canvas
 Canvas (TV channel), a Belgian public TV station
 CANVAS, Centre for Applied Nonviolent Action and Strategies
 Floating canvas, the cloth-construction inside a jacket or coat
 Canvas Stadium, a sports venue at Colorado State University
 Canvas (car company), American vehicle subscription company
 Cerebellar ataxia, neuropathy, vestibular areflexia syndrome, a neurological disorder
 CANVAS, arts and culture coverage on PBS NewsHour

See also
 Blank Canvas (disambiguation)
 Canvass (disambiguation)